John Wizards is the first album by South African band John Wizards, released on 2 September 2013 on Planet Mu Records.

Critical reception

The album was met with critical acclaim. Metacritic, which assigns a normalised rating out of 100 to reviews from mainstream critics, reported an average score of 81 based on 16 reviews, described as "universal acclaim". The Guardian awarded the album four out of five stars, and placed the album at number 8 on its top 10 albums of 2013. Pop Matters praised the album, saying, "[John Wizards] create multiple moods and textures that flow seamlessly into one another without a single dull or unnecessary moment anywhere on this record." NME gave the album a 7 out of 10, describing John Wizards as "the most globe-trotting band you'll hear this year." The album was awarded 5th best album of the year at the Worldwide Winners awards in 2014. South Africa's PLATFORM magazine placed the album at number 33 on its best albums list, with writer Andy Petersen saying, "it feels vibrant and necessary in a way that not too many South African albums of late have managed to feel."

Track listing

References

2013 debut albums